Ringsheim is a village in the district of Ortenau in Baden-Württemberg in Germany.

The village is served by Ringsheim/Europa-Park station.

External links 
 RingsheimWeb Page (in German)
 Ringsheim history, places of interest, destination (in German)

References

Ortenaukreis